Carl Nielsen's Saga-Drøm (Saga Dream), also known as Gunnar's Dream, is a tone poem for orchestra based on the Icelandic Njal's Saga. It was first performed at the Music Society (Musikforeningen) in Copenhagen on April 6, 1908 by Nielsen himself.

Background

While working on the music for Ludvig Holstein's drama Tove in the winter of 1907–08, Nielsen started to think about writing an orchestral piece based on Njal's Saga. The first traces of the introductory theme for clarinet and viola are to be found in a draft of Tove where it is played by a French horn. On April 1, 1908, just after completing Tove, Nielsen signed off the fair copy of Saga Drøm, only a few days before its scheduled performance. 
 
Nielsen no doubt learned of Njal's Saga and the piece's motto "Now Gunnar dreams; let him enjoy his dream in peace" from the translation by N.M. Petersen. The saga tells how Gunnar, on his way out of the country with Kolskeg and Hjort after being sentenced to exile, is so tired that he calls for a stop and falls into a troubled sleep. Hjort asks whether they should rouse him but Kolskeg replies, "No, let him enjoy his dream." In his dream, Gunnar imagines they are being attacked by wolves. He and Kolskeg manage to defend themselves but Hjort is killed. The others see Gunnar is having a nightmare but Kolskeg still insists that he should not be disturbed.

Reception

The reviews of the initial performance at the Music Society on April 6, 1908 were not very favorable. Dannebrog maintained: "It is not music at all, nothing but juxtapositions of sounds and an eternal build-up from pianissimo to fortissimo." William Behrend, writing in Illustreret Tidende concluded that though the piece had a "highly stimulating effect... it seems to lack proportions — to be at once too short and too long, as dreams after all can be."Robert Henriques, writing in Vort Land said"It is as much the daydreaming of a fantasist as a sleeping dream that the composer wanted to depict. The entire piece presents a clash between the reality of life (the fugato movement) and life as a preparatory stage for an afterlife (the chorale). In the middle of the piece Carl Nielsen has tried definitively to paint the confusion that seizes us when one idea after another rushes through our heads. He has done so very originally in a free cadenza of flute, oboe and clarinet,
later joined by bassoon, violins and a few cymbal tremolos. Saga Dream once more shows the talented composer’s ability to intertwine fine fibres of atmosphere into a tissue of notes that expresses the depth-seeking imagination of a distinctive personality. In this music there is nothing specious, although it does not easily always find a straight path to the listener’s immediate understanding. But this music is not to be dismissed as it speaks its own serious, penetrating language."

Music

The unusual insertion of a free cadenza half way through the work may well explain why several of the reviewers were hesitant in condoning the piece. Kristeligt Dagblad referred specifically to "an intermezzo of a kind that can hardly be described in musical terms: it sounded more like an orchestra tuning up for a concert." However, this compositional approach is echoed in Nielsen's "The Market in Ispahan" of Aladdin Op. 34 (1918–19) where partitions of the orchestra build upon one another.

In an interview in Politiken published a few years later, Nielsen explained his work in some detail: "I am so fond of the work myself. It is kept almost piano all the time and musically it is very radical. It depicts the dream of Gunnar of Hlidarende, this marvellous figure from Njal’s Saga who plundered and slaughtered, yet was still made of finer stuff and was ahead of his time. He dreams of a brighter, better future for mankind, and I have tried, in muted tones, to give voice to the strange ideas engendered in the dream. There are among other things four cadenzas for oboe, clarinet, bassoon and flute which run quite freely alongside one another, with no harmonic connection, and without my marking time. They are just like four streams of thought, each going its own way — differently and randomly for each performance — until they meet in a point of rest, as if flowing into a lock where they are united."

References

Compositions by Carl Nielsen
Incidental music
1908 compositions
Symphonic poems
Works based on sagas
Works set in the Viking Age